Gaudencio may refer to the following people:
Given name
Gaudencio Hernández Burgos (born 1962), Mexican politician 
Gaudencio Rosales (born 1932), Roman Catholic Cardinal and Archbishop of Manila, the Philippines 
José Gaudencio León Castañeda (born 1960), Mexican politician

Surname
Miguel Gaudêncio, African-Portuguese film director